Duljak Khan-e Mohammadabad (also Romanized as Dūljak Khān-e Moḩammadābād; also known as Moḩammadābād) is a village in Khandan Rural District, Tarom Sofla District, Qazvin County, Qazvin Province, Iran. At the 2006 census, its population was 116, in 40 families.

References 

Populated places in Qazvin County